Teeth is a 2007 American comedy horror film written and directed by Mitchell Lichtenstein. The film stars Jess Weixler and was produced by Lichtenstein on a budget of $2 million. The film premiered at the Sundance Film Festival on January 19, 2007, and received a limited release in the United States on January 18, 2008, by Roadside Attractions. Its title refers to the ancient trope of vagina dentata.

Teeth was positively received by critics and grossed $2,340,110 worldwide. At Sundance, Weixler received the Grand Jury Prize for Acting.

Plot
Dawn O'Keefe (Jess Weixler) is a teenage spokesperson for a Christian abstinence group called "the Promise". She attends groups with her two friends, Alisha (Julia Garro) and Phil (Adam Wagner). At home on several occasions, she hears her stepbrother Brad (John Hensley), and his girlfriend Melanie (Nicole Swahn) arguing about Brad's refusal to engage in vaginal intercourse with her, insisting on only having anal sex.

One afternoon, after giving a speech to her group about the purity ring worn by members of the group, Dawn is introduced to Tobey (Hale Appleman), whom she finds attractive. The four begin going out as a group. Dawn has fantasies about marrying Tobey, although after acknowledging the attraction, they agree that they cannot spend time together. However, they later give in and meet at a local swimming hole. After swimming together, they go into a cave to get warm and begin kissing. Dawn becomes uncomfortable and tries to get Tobey to go back outside, but Tobey becomes more physical and aggressive. Dawn panics and tries to push him off. Tobey shakes Dawn, smacking her head on the ground and dazing her;  Tobey takes the opportunity to begin raping her. Dawn fights back and inadvertently bites off his penis with her vagina. A horrified Dawn flees the scene. After a Promise meeting, she meets her classmate Ryan (Ashley Springer) at a dance; they talk, and he drops her off at her home.

Dawn goes back to the swimming hole and she screams in horror when she sees a freshwater crab crawling on Tobey's penis. She drops her purity ring off a cliff. She then researches "vagina dentata" and realizes that she may have it. She visits a gynecologist, Dr. Godfrey (Josh Pais), in an attempt to find out what is happening to her. When he assaults her in the guise of an examination, reaching up inside her without a glove, she panics and her vagina bites off four fingers on his right hand. While biking home, several police vehicles pass her, and she sees someone driving a car that looks like Tobey's car. She decides to go back to visit the pool to investigate. When she arrives, she sees the police bringing up Tobey's body – he presumably died of shock in the water. Meanwhile, back at home, her ill mother, Kim O'Keefe (Vivienne Benesch), collapses. Dawn comes home and finds her, while Brad and Melanie are seen in his room having sex while Dawn's mother lies on the floor. Dawn's mother is taken to the hospital.

Dawn goes to Ryan seeking help, hysterical about her encounter with the doctor, Tobey and her mother. Ryan gives her a sedative and masturbates her with a vibrator. Though initially afraid she will hurt him, she finds that when she is relaxed and is consenting to the sexual activity taking place, her "teeth" do not engage. The following morning, they have sex again, but mid-coitus, Ryan's friend calls. Ryan smugly boasts that he and the friend had bet on whether he could score with Dawn. In her anger, her vagina bites off his penis, and she leaves him to call his mother for help.

Dawn's stepfather Bill (Lenny Von Dohlen) attempts to throw Brad out, but Brad sets his dog on Bill, during which Brad confesses his love for Dawn. Dawn meets her stepfather and Melanie at the hospital after her mother has died. Seeing her stepfather hurt and hearing from Melanie how Brad told her to ignore her mother's cries for help earlier, she becomes emboldened by her power and goes back home to seek revenge. Dawn puts on make-up and goes to seduce her stepbrother. In the midst of the act, Brad recalls that, while still kids, Dawn bit his finger, but it was not her mouth that bit him. As he realizes this, Dawn's vagina bites off his penis. She drops it on the ground and although Brad calls his dog to bite her, the animal instead eats it, spitting out the genital pierced glans. Dawn leaves him and he presumably bleeds to death.

Dawn cycles away from home, but her bike tire sustains a puncture, so she begins hitchhiking. She gets a lift from an old man (Doyle Carter), but falls asleep and rides for several hours, waking up after nightfall at a gas station. When she tries to get out, he repeatedly locks the doors. He licks his lips as if to ask for a sexual favor to release her; Dawn hesitates, then looks towards the camera, and turns to the old man with a seductive smile.

Cast

Critical reception
The film received mostly positive reviews from critics. On review aggregator Rotten Tomatoes, the film has an approval rating of 80% based on 70 reviews, with an average score of 6.5/10. The site's critical consensus reads: "Smart, original, and horrifically funny, Teeth puts a fresh feminist spin on horror movie tropes." On Metacritic, the film received a score of 57/100 based on 22 reviews, indicating "mixed or average reviews".

Foundation artistic director at the Sundance Film Festival Mystelle Brabbée claimed it was "one of the most talked-about films at the Sundance Film Festival this year". Jess Weixler won the Special Jury Prize for Dramatic Performance (and tied with Tamara Podemski from the film Four Sheets to the Wind).

References

External links
 
 
 
 
 Talking TEETH With Director Mitchell Lichtenstein

2007 films
2007 black comedy films
2007 comedy horror films
2007 independent films
2000s English-language films
2000s feminist films
American black comedy films
American comedy horror films
American feminist comedy films
American independent films
American rape and revenge films
Dimension Films films
Films based on urban legends
Films shot in Texas
Incest in film
Teeth in fiction
2000s American films